Nicolas Devilder and Paul-Henri Mathieu were the defending champion, but they chose to participate that year.

František Čermák and Michal Mertiňák won in the final 6–2, 6–4 against Johan Brunström and Jean-Julien Rojer.

Seeds

Draw

Draw

External links
 Main Draw

2009
2009 ATP World Tour